The Marxist–Leninist Communist Party of Ecuador is an anti-revisionist Marxist–Leninist communist party in Ecuador, founded August 1, 1964, following a split from the Communist Party of Ecuador.

PCMLE publishes En Marcha, and is an active participant in the International Conference of Marxist-Leninist Parties and Organizations (Unity & Struggle).

In 1978 PCMLE founded the electoral wing Democratic People's Movement (MPD) before it was dissolved and replaced with Popular Unity (UP) in 2014.

The Workers' Party of Ecuador is a split from PCMLE.

Ideology
The party adheres to anti-revisionist Marxist-Leninist and strongly supports the ideology of Karl Marx, Friedrich Engels, Vladimir Lenin, Joseph Stalin, Enver Hoxha and Che Guevara.

References

External links 
 
 Interview With Wilson Alvarracin of the Marxist-Leninist Communist Party of Ecuador

1964 establishments in Ecuador
Communist parties in Ecuador
Anti-revisionist organizations
Stalinist parties
Hoxhaist parties
Far-left politics in Ecuador
International Conference of Marxist–Leninist Parties and Organizations (Unity & Struggle)
Political parties established in 1964
Plurinational Unity of the Lefts